The 2016–17 Abilene Christian Wildcats men's basketball team represented Abilene Christian University during the 2016–17 NCAA Division I men's basketball season. The Wildcats were led by sixth-year head coach Joe Golding and  played their home games at the Moody Coliseum in Abilene, Texas as members of the Southland Conference. They finished the season 13–16, 7–11 in Southland play to finish in a five-way tie for eighth place.

The Wildcats, in their final year of a four-year transition from Division II to Division I, were not eligible for a postseason tournament including the Southland tournament, but were considered a Division I team for scheduling purposes and a Division I RPI member.

Previous season 
The Wildcats finished the 2015–16 season with a record of 13–18, 8–10 in Southland play to finish in seventh place.

Roster

Schedule and results

|-
!colspan=9 style=| Non-conference regular season

|-
!colspan=9 style=| Southland regular season

See also
2016–17 Abilene Christian Wildcats women's basketball team

References

Abilene Christian Wildcats men's basketball seasons
Abilene Christian
Abilene Christian Wildcats basketball
Abilene Christian Wildcats basketball